V16  may refer to:

 V16 engine, a V-shaped engine with 16 cylinders
 Fokker V.16, a German experimental aircraft
 McDonnell Douglas AV-16, a proposed development of the AV-8A Harrier
 V16 warning beacon light, official name given in Spain to warner beacon light